Lago del Brugneto is a lake in the Province of Genova, Liguria, Italy. At an elevation of 775.8 m, its surface area is 0.97 km².

See also
 Lago del Brugneto in Italian

References

External links

Lakes of Liguria
Reservoirs in Italy